Bartschia agassizi is a species of sea snail, a marine gastropod mollusc in the family Colubrariidae.

Description

Distribution
This marine species occurs in the Gulf of Mexico, Cuba and Mexico.

References

Colubrariidae
Gastropods described in 1941